Lo Celso is a surname. Notable people with the surname include:

 Giovani Lo Celso (born 1996), Argentine footballer
 Francesco Lo Celso (born 2000), Argentine footballer